Danny Liam Allen-Page (born 30 October 1983) is an English former professional footballer who played as a defender.

Allen-Page started his career as a trainee with Brentford, making one first team appearance, before being released in 2004. He joined Farnborough Town and after two full seasons with them he left to join Yeading. They merged with Hayes in 2007 to form Hayes & Yeading United, with whom he won promotion to the Conference Premier in 2009. He was released a year later and joined Hampton & Richmond Borough, before having a spell with Merstham in 2012.

Career
Born in London, Allen-Page played for Crystal Palace as a schoolboy and later became a trainee with Brentford and signed his first professional contract in 2002. He made his first team debut as an 88th minute substitute in a 3–2 defeat to Peterborough United in the Football League Trophy on 4 November 2003. His contract at Brentford was cancelled by mutual consent under new manager Martin Allen in March 2004, after which he joined Football Conference team Farnborough Town. He made his debut as a 23rd-minute substitute for James Deacons in a 3–0 away defeat to Margate and he finished the 2003–04 season with four appearances for Farnborough, after which he signed a new one-year contract with the club. He scored with a "stunning drive" to give Farnborough the lead against Accrington Stanley on 2 October 2004, with the match ending as a 2–1 home victory. He finished the 2004–05 season with 31 appearances and one goal, while Farnborough were relegated to the Conference South, after which manager Frank Gray exercised his option to extend Allen-Page's contract. He made 23 appearances for Farnborough in the 2005–06 season, including an appearance in the play-off semi-finals.

Allen-Page left Farnborough in July 2006 because of the instability at the club and he subsequently signed for Yeading. He played for Yeading in a 5–0 defeat to Nottingham Forest at the City Ground on 11 November 2006 in the second round of the FA Cup. He made 39 appearances for Yeading during the 2006–07 season. Following the merger of Hayes and Yeading, Allen-Page joined the new club, Hayes & Yeading United. He scored the opening goal for Hayes & Yeading against Dorchester Town in January 2008, which finished as a 2–2 draw. He finished the 2007–08 season with 46 appearances and one goal for Hayes & Yeading. Hayes & Yeading were promoted to the Conference Premier after the 2008–09 season, during which he made 45 appearances. Allen-Page played as a right midfielder in Hayes & Yeading's first Conference Premier game, which finished as a 1–0 defeat to Kidderminster Harriers on 8 August 2009. In the following match, Allen-Page scored Hayes & Yeading's first goal as a Conference Premier club with a 62nd-minute equaliser in a 1–1 draw at home to Stevenage Borough. He finished the 2009–10 season with 38 appearances and three goals, and was released by Hayes & Yeading on 7 May 2010.

Allen-Page returned to playing in the Conference South after signing for Hampton & Richmond Borough during the summer of 2010. He made 14 appearances for the club in the 2010–11 season before joining Merstham of the Isthmian League Division One South during the summer of 2012.

Style of play
He was a right sided player who played as a right-back or midfielder, and has been described as being "one of the best in the league at his job".

Career statistics

References

External links

1983 births
Living people
Footballers from Greater London
English footballers
Association football defenders
Association football midfielders
Association football utility players
Crystal Palace F.C. players
Brentford F.C. players
Farnborough F.C. players
Yeading F.C. players
Hayes & Yeading United F.C. players
Hampton & Richmond Borough F.C. players
Merstham F.C. players
National League (English football) players